Benjamin Franklin Langworthy was a politician in the state of Minnesota.

Biography
Langworthy was born Benjamin Franklin Langworthy on January 20, 1822, to Cyrus and Charlotte Langworthy in Mansfield, Ohio. Eventually he would move to Oshkosh, Wisconsin and Mower County, Minnesota. His father served in the Ohio State House of Representatives. Two first cousins, Lucius Hart Langworthy and Edward Langworthy, would become involved in politics in Iowa. He died on January 23, 1907, in Brownsdale, Minnesota.

Career
Langworthy served in the Minnesota State House of Representatives from 1859 to 1860.

References

Politicians from Mansfield, Ohio
Politicians from Oshkosh, Wisconsin
People from Mower County, Minnesota
Members of the Minnesota House of Representatives
1822 births
1907 deaths
19th-century American politicians